Okey Johnson (born Long Reach in what was then the state of Virginia, March 24, 1834; died New York City, New York, June 16, 1903) was a lawyer, politician, judge, and educator in the state of West Virginia. He served as a justice of the Supreme Court of Appeals of West Virginia from January 1, 1877, to December 31, 1888.

After graduating from Marietta High School across the river in Ohio in 1856, Johnson entered Harvard Law School, earning a degree in 1858. After several years farming and undertaking trading voyages on riverboats, he established a law practice in Parkersburg in May 1862. An active Democrat, Johnson was an elector for George B. McClellan in 1864. Johnson was elected to the state senate in 1870 and to the constitutional convention of 1872. In 1876 he was elected to the Supreme Court of Appeals, serving a 12-year term.

In 1896 Johnson served on a committee of the West Virginia Academy of Science to inquire into forest protection and draft legislation to set aside forest reservations in the state.

Johnson served as the dean of the West Virginia University College of Law from 1895 to 1903. He died in New York City after having surgery there.

Johnson married Sarah Elizabeth Stephenson (1836-1921), widow of Benjamin Jackson. They had five children.

References

People from Tyler County, West Virginia
Harvard Law School alumni
West Virginia state senators
Justices of the Supreme Court of Appeals of West Virginia
1834 births
1903 deaths
West Virginia University College of Law faculty
19th-century American politicians
19th-century American judges
People from Parkersburg, West Virginia